The 2013 3 Hours of Inje was the first round of the 2013 Asian Le Mans Series season and the first Asian Le Mans Series race since the 2009 1000 km of Okayama. It took place on August 4, 2013, at the Inje Speedium in Inje County, South Korea.

Race result
Race result is as follows. Class winners in bold.

References

External links
 

Inje
Inje